Persoonia subtilis is a plant in the family Proteaceae and is endemic to south-east Queensland.

Description
Flowering mainly occurs from November to January and the fruit is a green drupe with purple stripes.

Taxonomy
Persoonia subtilis was first formally described in 1994 by Peter Weston and Lawrie Johnson in the journal Telopea from specimens collected in 1990 near the falls on Mimosa Creek on the Blackdown Tableland.

Distribution and habitat
This geebung grows in forest and woodland in the area between the Blackdown Tableland, Carnarvon Range and Barakula in south-eastern Queensland.

References

subtilis
Flora of Queensland
Plants described in 1994
Taxa named by Lawrence Alexander Sidney Johnson
Taxa named by Peter H. Weston